A microbe is an organism that is microscopic.

Microbe may also refer to:
 Microbe (comics), a Marvel Comics superhero
 The Microbe, a 1919 American comedy film starring Viola Dana
 Microbe Magazine, the news magazine of the American Society for Microbiology

See also
 Saša Marković Mikrob, Serbian artist